Some More of Samoa is a 1941 short subject directed by Del Lord starring American slapstick comedy team The Three Stooges (Moe Howard, Larry Fine and Curly Howard). It is the 59th entry in the series released by Columbia Pictures starring the comedians, who released 190 shorts for the studio between 1934 and 1959.

Plot
The Stooges are tree surgeons who are enlisted by a rich old man to find a mate for his rare puckerless persimmon tree. The boys sail to the fictional tropical island of Rhum-Boogie to find the tree. When they arrive they are captured by the natives and will be eaten unless Curly marries the Chief's ugly sister. The Stooges manage to escape with the tree and, after a confrontation with an alligator, sail off with their prize. Their boat however, slowly sinks into the water.

Production notes
Some More of Samoa was filmed on May 12–15, 1941. The film's title is a self-contained pun, as "Samoa" is pronounced similarly to slurring "some more of" as "some mo' o'". The film is set on the fictional island of Rhum Boogie, not Samoa.

There are several continuity errors in Some More of Samoa. When Curly runs into the king’s hut he is still covered with the flour sifted on him from when a cook is preparing the Stooges for dinner, but when he goes into the hut and tangles with the idol, the flour is gone. After he grabs the tree and runs off, the flour is back on. In addition, when Curly puts his head in the bag to answer the telephone, he starts whining before Moe actually closes the bag on his neck.

A very noticeable error is when Curly is about to be cooked and says "Soupbone" (just before pushing the cook into the boiling water), he has a large apple shoved into his mouth, yet his voice is heard clearly.

For a second time (after Movie Maniacs), Carnation milk ("from contented cows") is invoked. The natives of Rhum Boogie are described as living on "milk from contented coconuts."

When Moe and Larry run into a native and he introduces himself as "King Fisher" they reply with an Amos 'n Andy joke routine. Kingfish was a recurring character in the Amos 'n Andy radio show.

Some More of Samoa features a recurring gag often shown when the Stooges portray doctors or are mixing drinks, as in the films Men In Black and All Gummed Up. They stand in an assembly line formation and the first member (usually Moe) calls for a series of complex, often gibberish-sounding surgical tools or drink ingredients, with the other two repeating the orders and passing them to him. At a certain point, Moe will call for cotton, and be ignored at first, then angrily call for it again, prompting one of the other Stooges to retaliate and throw a large wad of wet cotton at Moe's face.

References

External links 
 
 
 Some More of Samoa at threestooges.net
 Some More of Samoa at Three Stooges Pictures

1941 films
The Three Stooges films
American black-and-white films
Films directed by Del Lord
Films set on fictional islands
Columbia Pictures short films
American slapstick comedy films
1941 comedy films
1940s English-language films
1940s American films